Wunderbar Films is an Indian film production and distribution company established by Actor Dhanush and his wife Aishwarya on 20 May 2010. Based in Chennai, Tamil Nadu, it  mainly produces and distributes Tamil films, and occasionally Malayalam and Hindi films. The headquarters of the company is located in Nungambakkam, Chennai.

History 
Wunderbar Films was established by actor Dhanush and his wife Aishwarya on 20 May 2010. The studio was named "Wunderbar", which means "wonderful" in German, out of sentimental value. Earlier short films made by Dhanush, although not released to the public, had the banner "Wunderbar", which they picked up from the 2009 film Inglourious Basterds. Wunderbar Film is located in Nungambaakam, Chennai

Filmography

Film soundtracks released

References 

2010 establishments in Tamil Nadu
Film production companies based in Chennai
Indian film studios